Kevin Guy-Noel Pierre Tapoko (born 13 April 1994) is a French professional footballer who plays as a midfielder for  club Laval.

Club career

Early career
Tapoko initially started his footballing career with hometown club Laval but moved on to Lyon where he would go on to spend two years as an academy player. In 2011, he transferred to Le Mans where he featured for the club's reserve team before leaving at the end of the season.

In August 2012 Tapoko moved abroad to Swiss Super League club Lausanne on a free transfer. He made his league debut for Lausanne on 16 March 2013 in a 3–1 away loss against St. Gallen, coming on as a substitute for the final 12 minutes. During the 2012–13 season, Tapoko also featured for the reserve team and went on trial with Watford in England Championship. 

Ahead of the 2013–14 season, Tapoko signed for two years with Belgian Second Division side Dessel. He went on to play for two teams from the Belgian Pro League, OH Leuven and Royal Excel Mouscron. After that he also had a short spell with RWS Bruxelles, playing at the third level of Belgian football. 

On 14 January 2017, Tapoko signed a contract till the end of the 2016–17 season with Greek club Panionios of the Superleague Greece. In January 2018 he moved to Aris Limassol of the Cypriot First Division. On 12 June 2018, Tapoko returned to the Superleague Greece, signing a contract with Apollon Smyrni. He was released after a very short time.

In Israel 
On 20 August 2018, ahead of the 2018–19 Israeli Premier League, Tapoko signed with Hapoel Hadera of the Israeli Premier League. On 18 August 2018, he made his debut in a 2–1 win over Ashdod in the Toto Cup at Yud-Alef Stadium. On 25 August, Tapoko made his debut in a 1–2 win over Hapoel Tel Aviv in the Israeli Premier League at Netanya Stadium. On 28 October, Tapoko scored his first goal in a 2–3 win over Ashdod in the Israeli Premier League at Netanya Stadium.

On 4 January 2019, Tapoko signed with Hapoel Be'er Sheva for three and a half years. As part of the deal it was agreed that the player would move to Hapoel Be'er Sheva on 13 January, after Hapoel Hadera's match against Bnei Sakhnin on 12 January at Netanya Stadium.

In May 2020 Tapoko as signed a deal to be loaned out to Grenoble playing in the Ligue 2 for the 2020–21 season.

On 5 September 2021, he returned to Hapoel Haifa on a permanent basis.

Return to France
On 21 June 2022, Tapoko signed with Laval.

International career
Tapoko was a France youth international, having previously competed at France national under-16 team. In 2010, he was part of the France national under-16 team that played at the 2010 Montaigu Tournament, finishing in third place.

Personal life
Born in France, Tapoko is the son of the Cameroon international footballer Guy Tapoko.

References

External links
 The successor to John Ogu? The story of Kevin Tapoko at Ynet
 Kevin Tapoko at Israel Football Association
 
 

1994 births
Living people
People from Laval, Mayenne
French footballers
France youth international footballers
French sportspeople of Cameroonian descent
FC Lausanne-Sport players
K.F.C. Dessel Sport players
Oud-Heverlee Leuven players
Royal Excel Mouscron players
Aris Limassol FC players
Apollon Smyrnis F.C. players
Hapoel Hadera F.C. players
Hapoel Be'er Sheva F.C. players
Hapoel Haifa F.C. players
Grenoble Foot 38 players
PFC Beroe Stara Zagora players
Stade Lavallois players
Swiss Super League players
Belgian Pro League players
Challenger Pro League players
Israeli Premier League players
Ligue 2 players 
First Professional Football League (Bulgaria) players
Association football forwards
French expatriate footballers
Expatriate footballers in Switzerland
French expatriate sportspeople in Switzerland
Expatriate footballers in Belgium
French expatriate sportspeople in Belgium
Expatriate footballers in Greece
French expatriate sportspeople in Greece
Expatriate footballers in Cyprus
French expatriate sportspeople in Cyprus
Expatriate footballers in Israel
French expatriate sportspeople in Israel
Expatriate footballers in Bulgaria
French expatriate sportspeople in Bulgaria
Sportspeople from Mayenne
Footballers from Pays de la Loire